Gordon Eyres (20 December 1912 – 21 August 2004) was an Australian cricketer. He played eight first-class matches for Western Australia between 1937/38 and 1939/40.

See also
 List of Western Australia first-class cricketers

References

External links
 

1912 births
2004 deaths
Australian cricketers
Western Australia cricketers